Earl Mountbatten of Burma is a title in the Peerage of the United Kingdom. It was created on 28 October 1947 for Rear Admiral Louis Mountbatten, 1st Viscount Mountbatten of Burma. The letters patent creating the title specified the following remainder in the absence of heirs male:

...to his eldest daughter Patricia Edwina Victoria, Baroness Brabourne...and the heirs male of her body lawfully begotten; and in default of such issue to every other daughter lawfully begotten of the said Louis Francis Albert Victor Nicholas, Viscount Mountbatten of Burma, successively in order of seniority of age and priority of birth and to the heirs male of their bodies lawfully begotten...

As a result, since Lord Mountbatten had no sons, his elder daughter, Patricia, succeeded as the 2nd Countess Mountbatten of Burma upon the former's death. Should the legitimate male line of descent of the 2nd Countess Mountbatten of Burma become extinct, the peerages will be inherited by her sister, Lady Pamela Hicks, and her legitimate heirs male. Should the legitimate male line of both sisters become extinct, the peerages will become extinct.

The subsidiary titles of the earldom are Viscount Mountbatten of Burma, of Romsey in the County of Southampton (created 1946), and Baron Romsey, of Romsey in the County of Southampton (1947). Both of these titles, in the Peerage of the United Kingdom, have the same special remainder as the Earldom. Lord Romsey was the courtesy title by which Lady Mountbatten's eldest son and heir was known until he succeeded his father as The 8th Baron Brabourne in 2005. Subsequently, with the death of his mother on 13 June 2017, Lord Brabourne became the 3rd Earl Mountbatten of Burma. As consequence, both the peerage title Baron Brabourne (created in 1880 for Liberal politician Edward Knatchbull-Hugessen) and the Knatchbull Baronetcy (created in 1641 for politician Norton Knatchbull) became subsidiary to that of the Earldom. Lord Brabourne is now the courtesy title by which Lord Mountbatten's eldest son is known.

While the male-line heirs of Lady Pamela Hicks, second daughter of the 1st Earl, are in the line of succession to the earldom, they are not in line to the Brabourne Barony.  Should the 7th Baron Brabourne's male line become extinct, the title would revert to a male-line descendant of the 1st Baron Brabourne's 3rd son.

The family seat is Newhouse Manor, near Ashford, Kent.

Earls Mountbatten of Burma (1947)

The heir apparent is the present holder's only son, Nicholas Louis Charles Norton Knatchbull, Lord Brabourne (born 1981).

Line of succession

 Louis Mountbatten, 1st Earl Mountbatten of Burma (1900–1979)
 Patricia Knatchbull, 2nd Countess Mountbatten of Burma (1924–2017)
 Norton Knatchbull, 3rd Earl Mountbatten of Burma (born 1947)
  (1) Nicholas Knatchbull, Lord Brabourne (b. 1981) 
(2) The Hon. Alexander Knatchbull (b. 2022)  
  (3) The Hon. Michael Knatchbull (b. 1950) 
  (4) The Hon. Philip Knatchbull (b. 1961) 
 (5) Frederick Knatchbull (b. 2003) 
  (6). John Knatchbull (b. 2004)
  (7). The Hon. Timothy Knatchbull (b. 1964)
  (8) Milo Knatchbull (b. 2001) 
  (9). Ludovic Knatchbull (b. 2003) 
  (10) Lady Pamela Hicks (b. 1929)
  (11) Ashley Hicks (b. 1963)
  (12) Caspian Hicks (b. 2018)
   (13) Horatio Hicks (b. 2019)

Source:

Coat of arms of the 1st earl

Quarterly: 1st and 4th, azure a lion rampant double-queued barry of ten argent and gules armed and langued of the last crowned or within a bordure company of the second and third (Hesse); 2nd and 3rd, argent two pallets sable (Battenberg); charged on the honour point with an escutcheon of the arms of the late Princess Alice, namely: the royal arms differenced by a label of three points argent the centre point charged with a rose gules barbed Vert and each of the other points with an ermine spot sable. The shield is encircled with the Order of the Garter, of which the 1st earl was a member.

References

External links
 
 Tribute & Memorial Website to Louis, 1st Earl Mountbatten of Burma

Earldoms in the Peerage of the United Kingdom
Noble titles created in 1947
Peerages created with special remainders